Year 1406 (MCDVI) was a common year starting on Friday (link will display the full calendar) of the Julian calendar.

Events 
 January–December 
 April 4 – James I becomes King of Scotland, after having been captured by Henry IV of England.
 October 7 – French troops comprising 1,000 men at arms land on Jersey, and fight a battle against 3,000 defenders.
 October 13 – Richard Whittington is elected Lord Mayor of London for a second full term. He holds this office simultaneously, with that of Mayor of the Calais Staple.
 October 26 – Eric of Pomerania marries Philippa, daughter of Henry IV of England.
 November 30 – Pope Gregory XII succeeds Pope Innocent VII, as the 205th pope.
 December 25 – John II becomes King of Castile.

 Date unknown 
 Construction of the Forbidden City begins in Beijing during the Chinese Ming Dynasty.
 Pisa is subjugated by Florence.

Births 
 January 28 – Guy XIV de Laval, French noble (d. 1486)
 July 11 – William, Margrave of Hachberg-Sausenberg, Margrave of Hachberg-Sausenberg (1428-1441) (d. 1482)
 September 26 – Thomas de Ros, 8th Baron de Ros, English soldier and politician (d. 1430)
 date unknown
 John, Margrave of Brandenburg-Kulmbach (d. 1464)
 Margaret, Countess of Vertus, French countess (d. 1466)
 Martin of Aragon, Aragon infante (d. 1407)
 Ulrich II, Count of Celje (d. 1456)
 probable date
Iancu de Hunedoara – governor of Hungary (d. 1456)

Deaths 
 January 6 – Roger Walden, English bishop
 March 17 – Ibn Khaldun, African Arab historian (b. 1332)
 April 4 – King Robert III of Scotland (b. 1337)
 May 4 – Coluccio Salutati, Chancellor of Florence (b. 1331)
 July 15 – William, Duke of Austria
 August 28 – John de Sutton V (b. 1380)
 September 16 – Cyprian, Metropolitan of Moscow
 November 1 – Joanna, Duchess of Brabant (b. 1322)
 November 6 – Pope Innocent VII (b. 1339)
 December 25 – King Henry III of Castile (b. 1379)
 probable date – Tokhtamysh, khan of the Golden Horde

References